The Global Poker Index (GPI) is a leaderboard index that ranks over 450,000 live tournament poker players in the world. The GPI poker rankings are updated on a weekly basis. Players’ performances are assessed by their finishing positions in poker tournaments occurring over six periods of six months (3 years).

The Global Poker Index uses data from the biggest poker database The Hendon Mob, known for collecting results of tournaments around the world and for being the reference in tournament results. They currently host results for over 325,000 poker tournaments.

The index is used in famous newspapers along with sports results to communicate poker rankings, both on the online and print version.

History 
The Global Poker Index was originally created by Federated Sports + Gaming, along with the Epic Poker League(EPL), with Former World Series of Poker (WSOP) commissioner Jeffrey Pollack acting as the executive chairman, professional poker player Annie Duke as commissioner, and Matt Savage as the League's tournament director. The GPI was employed to rank players for the EPL and decide which players could take part in the League. On 29 February 2012, when Federated Sports + Gaming announced that they had filed for Bankruptcy, all of the organizations and all the brands were acquired by Pinnacle Entertainment, Inc., at a bankruptcy auction in June 2012. Following this acquisition, Zokay Entertainment and the company's CEO, Alexandre Dreyfus acquired the GPI brand, along with its patent-pending formula, in order to create a single, unified ranking platform covering the live tournament poker world in its entirety.

The GPI ranking system 
The GPI tracks players' results for their prior 3 years of play, in qualifying tournaments with 32 or more entrants (specialty events and freerolls are not counted), using a patent-pending formula that takes into account result ages, field difficulties, and field sizes to generate live tournament player rankings.

For each qualifying tournament a player finishes in-the-money they receive a GPI score. Those scores fall into one of six time periods, each of which covers a half-year based on the starting date of the tournament. These are called GPI Aging Periods. The sum of the player's largest five (5) scores for each of the two Aging Periods in the most recent year and their four (4) largest scores for the four Aging Periods prior to that is their total GPI score. 
GPI scores themselves are calculated by multiplying a Buy-in Factor, Finishing Factor, and Aging Factor.

The Buy-in Factor is the GPI's measure of relative difficulty, presuming larger buy-ins draw a more skilled field.  Its median is calculated by dividing the USD equivalent of a $1,000 buy-in (fee included) by 1,000. This results in a Buy-in Factor of 1.0 for a $1,000 tournament, with Buy-in Factors being larger or smaller than 1.0 depending on whether the buy-in is larger or smaller than $1,000. This calculation uses a logarithmic function. It does so because the incremental increase in the skill set of the field theoretically diminishes as the buy-in amount increases. For example, in the GPI formula the percentage increase of GPI's Buy-In Factor between a $1500 event and an $2000 event is much greater than its percentage increase between $19,500 and a $20,000 buy-in events. Furthermore, all tournaments with a buy-in larger than $20,000 are treated as though the buy-in was only $20,000 and all tournaments with a buy-in smaller than $400 are treated as though the buy-in was $400.

The GPI also includes a Finishing Factor, which measures how players perform relative to the rest of the field they compete within in any given poker tournament. This Finishing Factor is calculated initially by dividing the field size by the player's finishing position and is also done using a logarithmic function. Furthermore, for any tournaments with a field size larger than 2,700 players will be treated as though their field was only 2,700. The GPI also employs an Aging Factor to player results. This is a multiplier that gives more points to tournaments based on how recently they were played in order to reward players both for recent success and consistency over time. Each Aging Period consists of 6 month periods of time, with the most recent being the previous 6 months from the present, and going backwards from there through to a point 3 years in the past. Each Aging Period has a different multiplier that is applied to score calculations, with multipliers decreasing as each Aging Period becomes less recent.

National and regional rankings 
The Global Poker Index National Rankings ranks players by Country, with 20 different national rankings are currently available, by North American, Latin American, European, and Asian regions as well. The GPI is used as a central reference point when ranking live tournament poker players including France, Italy, Spain, Brazil, Latin America  and the USA.

Poker team rankings 
The GPI create rankings of players comprising professional poker teams to show which teams’ players have the best overall results. Ranked teams include PokerStars, Winamax and Party Poker.

Former Number Ones 
 Jason Mercier
 Bertrand Grospellier
 Erik Seidel
 Dan Smith
 Marvin Rettenmaier
 Ole Schemion
 Daniel Negreanu
 Vanessa Selbst
 Scott Seiver
 Anthony Zinno
 Byron Kaverman
 Steve O'Dwyer
 Fedor Holz
 David Peters
 Nick Petrangelo
 Bryn Kenney
 Adrián Mateos
 Stephen Chidwick
 Alex Foxen

GPI Player Of the Year 
The GPI Player Of the Year (POY) award is given to the player topping GPI's Player of the Year Leaderboard at the end of each calendar year. Standings are updated weekly with the top 1,000 contenders ranked according to results, with the Leaderboard utilizing an augmented version of GPI's existing ranking formula which disregards aging factors and includes 11 total results from qualifying tournament results in each given year (top 6 results from the first 6 months of the year and top 5 results from these 6 months of each year). Buy in restrictions, minimum player field restrictions are kept as-is, as
 POY 2012 : Dan Smith 
 POY 2013 : Ole Schemion
 POY 2014 : Daniel Colman
 POY 2015 : Byron Kaverman
 POY 2016 : David Peters
 POY 2017 : Adrián Mateos
 POY 2018 : Alex Foxen
 POY 2019 : Alex Foxen
 POY 2021: Ali Imsirovic
 POY 2022: Stephen Song

Global poker masters 
The Global Poker Index aggregates the Top 300 performing players in the world and groups them by nationality to create GPI Country Rankings to show how many top players hail from specific nations. Currently the US is the world's top performing country in terms of live tournament player results, with over 50% of all Top 300 GPI ranked players being American.
Using the country rankings, the Global Poker Masters will be a world cup of poker, gathering the best players from 9 countries around the world, in order to decide which country is the best.

Awards 
The Global Poker Index is the host of the European Poker Awards. The GPI EPA takes place every year in January and rewards the best European Poker Players and newcomers, as well as the people involved in the industry.

Starting in 2015, the American Poker Awards took place in Los Angeles, USA, and rewarded the best live poker players in America, as well as the biggest contributors in the industry. 

Starting in 2019, the Global Poker Index announced the 1st Annual Global Poker Awards to be held on April 5, 2019. The event would combine multiple awards programs, including the American Poker Awards and European Poker Awards.

2019 Global Poker Awards 
The 1st Annual Global Poker Awards presented by PokerStars for the 2018 poker season was held on April 5, 2019, at the PokerGO Studio at ARIA Resort & Casino. There were 20 awards presented, and the show was aired on PokerGO and was hosted by Ali Nejad and Drea Renae.
Winners are listed first, highlighted in boldface, and indicated with a double dagger (‡).

2020 Global Poker Awards 
The 2nd Annual Global Poker Awards for the 2019 poker season was held on March 6, 2020, at the PokerGO Studio at ARIA Resort & Casino. There were 25 awards presented, and the show was aired on PokerGO and was hosted by Maria Ho and Drea Renae.
Winners are listed first, highlighted in boldface, and indicated with a double dagger (‡).

2022 Global Poker Awards 
The 3rd Annual Global Poker Awards for the 2021 poker season was held on February 18, 2022, at the PokerGO Studio at ARIA Resort & Casino. There were 26 awards presented, and the show was aired on PokerGO and was hosted by Jeff Platt and Drea Renae.

Winners are listed first, highlighted in boldface, and indicated with a double dagger (‡).

2023 Global Poker Awards 
The 4th Annual Global Poker Awards for the 2022 poker season was held on March 3, 2023, at the PokerGO Studio at ARIA Resort & Casino. There were 27 awards presented, and the show was aired on PokerGO and was hosted by Jeff Platt and Drea Renae.

Winners are listed first, highlighted in boldface, and indicated with a double dagger (‡).

Fantasy poker manager 
The Global Poker Index released the first ever Fantasy Poker game allowing poker fans to draft for free their favorite players for the biggest poker tournaments in the world. The game quickly became the official game of the World Poker Tour and the World Series of Poker
The game consists in drafting 10 poker players with a defined virtual budget, following the concept of fantasy sports in general.

GPI Magazine 
GPI launched its first print publication during the 2014 World Series of Poker where the magazine was distributed for free in the Rio All Suite Hotel and Casino, as well as in other places in Las Vegas. The 56 page first edition saw the poker pro Vanessa Selbst making the cover, and featured numerous people from the industry.

References

External links 
 GlobalPokerIndex.com
 Global Poker Index Definition
 European Poker Awards website
 American Poker Awards website
 The 1st GPI magazine

Poker companies